Christophe-André Frassa (born 4 February 1968) is a French politician and a member of the Senate of France. He is a member of the Union for a Popular Movement Party.

References
Page on the Senate website
http://www.senat.fr/listes/senatl.html

1968 births
Living people
French Senators of the Fifth Republic
The Republicans (France) politicians
Union for a Popular Movement politicians
Senators of French citizens living abroad
Monegasque people
Côte d'Azur University alumni
Paris-Sorbonne University alumni
Sciences Po alumni
Tufts University alumni